is a former Japanese idol who is a former member of the female idol group Up Up Girls (Kakko Kari) and the K-pop cover dance group UFZS.

She was represented with Up-Front Create.

Works

Videos

Filmography

Concerts

Events

Stage musicals

Films

Television

TV dramas

Internet videos

Advertisements

References

External links
 Blogs, SNS by herself
 – Ameba Blog 
 
Perfect Beauty o Mezase Ayano Sato 
Ayano Sato no Fashion Coordinate Ichiran – Wear 

 Others
 
 – Ameba Blog 

Japanese idols
Musicians from Kanagawa Prefecture
1995 births
Living people